Disability and Rehabilitation is a peer-reviewed medical journal covering all aspects of disability and rehabilitation medicine, including practice and policy aspects of the rehabilitation process. The journal is published by Taylor and Francis Group and the editor-in-chief is Dave Müller (Suffolk New College). It was established in 1978 and has a 2018 impact factor of 2.054. The journal is published 26 times a year.

References

External links 
 

English-language journals
Taylor & Francis academic journals
Publications established in 1978
Rehabilitation medicine journals
Biweekly journals